Pre-Hellenistic Classical Greece

Homer
Anaximander
Hecataeus of Miletus
Massaliote Periplus
Scylax of Caryanda (6th century BC)
Herodotus

Hellenistic period
Pytheas (died c. 310 BC)
Periplus of Pseudo-Scylax (3rd or 4th century BC)
Megasthenes (died c. 290 BC)
Autolycus of Pitane (died c. 290 BC)
Dicaearchus (died c. 285 BC)
Deimakos (3rd century BC)
Timosthenes (fl. 270s BC)
Eratosthenes (c. 276-194 BC)
Scymnus (fl. 180s BC)
Hipparchus (c. 190-120 BC)
Agatharchides (2nd century BC)
Posidonius (c. 135-51 BC)
Pseudo-Scymnus (c. 90 BC)
Diodorus Siculus (c. 90-30 BC)
Alexander Polyhistor (1st century BC)

Roman Empire period 

Periplus of the Erythraean Sea
Strabo (64 BC - 24 AD)
Pomponius Mela (fl. 40s AD)
Isidore of Charax (1st century AD)
Mucianus (1st century AD)
Pliny the Elder (23-79 AD), Natural History
Marinus of Tyre (c. 70–130)
Ptolemy (90-168), Geography
Pausanias (2nd century)
Agathedaemon of Alexandria (2nd century)
Dionysius of Byzantium (2nd century)
Agathemerus (3rd century)
Tabula Peutingeriana (4th century)
Alypius of Antioch (4th century)
Marcian of Heraclea (4th century)
Expositio totius mundi et gentium (AD 350–362)
Julius Honorius (very uncertain: 4th, 5th or 6th century)

Byzantine Empire
Hierocles (author of Synecdemus) (6th century)
Cosmas Indicopleustes (6th century)
Stephanus of Byzantium (6th century)

See also
History of geography

References

External links 
 Karl Wilhelm Ludwig Müller:
 Geographi graeci minores, Carolus Muellerus (ed.), 2 voll., Parisiis, editoribus Firmin-Didot et sociis, 1855-61: vol. 1 (1882 reprint), vol. 2, tabulae.
 Gottfried Bernhardy:
 Geographi graeci minores, Godofredi Bernhardy (ed.), Lipsiae in libraria Weidmannia, 1828: vol. 1.

Ancient Greece-related lists
 
Ancient Roman geography
Classical geography
Geographers
 
Greco-Roman world